Hazrah   is a Syrian village located in Al-Dana Nahiyah in Harem District, Idlib.  According to the Syria Central Bureau of Statistics (CBS), Hazrah had a population of 631 in the 2004 census.

References 

Populated places in Harem District